AWB may refer to:

 .awb, a filename extension for Adaptive Multi-Rate Wideband computer files
 Afrikaner Weerstandsbeweging, a South African neo-Nazi separatist political and paramilitary organisation
 Air waybill, a receipt issued by an international courier company
 Average White Band, a Scottish band
 AWB (album), a 1974 album by Average White Band
 Aviation Without Borders, a humanitarian organization
 AWB Limited, the former Australian Wheat Board
 Federal Assault Weapons Ban, a US law
 Astronomers Without Borders, a US-based organization dedicated to astronomy
 Aaron Wan-Bissaka (born 1997), an English professional footballer
 Automatic White Balance in photography